Stantonville is a town in McNairy County, Tennessee. The population was 312 at the 2000 census and 283 at the 2010 census.

Geography
Stantonville is located at  (35.158143, -88.428354).

Newspaper
Stantonville's newspaper is the Independent Appeal, which serves all of McNairy County. It was founded in 1902. It is located at 111 N. 2nd St. in Selmer.

Demographics

As of the census of 2000, there were 312 people, 122 households, and 89 families residing in the town. The population density was 282.0 people per square mile (108.5/km2). There were 137 housing units at an average density of 123.8 per square mile (47.7/km2). The racial makeup of the town was 97.44% White, 0.96% from other races, and 1.60% from two or more races. Hispanic or Latino of any race were 1.60% of the population.

There were 122 households, out of which 27.0% had children under the age of 18 living with them, 57.4% were married couples living together, 11.5% had a female householder with no husband present, and 27.0% were non-families. 23.8% of all households were made up of individuals, and 13.9% had someone living alone who was 65 years of age or older. The average household size was 2.56 and the average family size was 2.96.

In the town, the population was spread out, with 21.5% under the age of 18, 11.2% from 18 to 24, 22.8% from 25 to 44, 26.6% from 45 to 64, and 17.9% who were 65 years of age or older. The median age was 40 years. For every 100 females, there were 103.9 males. For every 100 females age 18 and over, there were 92.9 males.

The median income for a household in the town was $33,047, and the median income for a family was $34,432. Males had a median income of $21,607 versus $15,469 for females. The per capita income for the town was $13,378. About 3.3% of families and 4.7% of the population were below the poverty line, including 7.8% of those under age 18 and 5.9% of those age 65 or over.

References

Towns in McNairy County, Tennessee
Towns in Tennessee